Leonardo Martins Dinelli or Zada (born August 21, 1977) is a Brazilian footballer that previously plays for Persela Lamongan in the 2009-10 Indonesia Super League.

References

External links

1977 births
Association football midfielders
Brazilian expatriate footballers
Brazilian expatriate sportspeople in Indonesia
Brazilian footballers
Expatriate footballers in Indonesia
Liga 1 (Indonesia) players
Living people
Persela Lamongan players
Ji-Paraná Futebol Clube players
Associação Académica de Coimbra – O.A.F. players
PSMS Medan players